Lipnik is an osiedle (district) of Bielsko-Biała, Silesian Voivodeship, southern Poland. The osiedle has an area of 8.9317 km2 and on December 31, 2006, had 5,885 inhabitants.

It is located in the east part of the city. Historically it was also subdivided into Lipnik Dolny (lower) and Lipnik Górny (upper).

History 
The village was established in the late 13th century. It was first mentioned in 1326 in the register of Peter's Pence payment among Catholic parishes of Oświęcim deaconry of the Diocese of Kraków as Lipnik. The name was of Slavic origin, derived from tilia trees (Polish: lipa). Later the village was also known under German name of Kunzendorf, as it was later a part of a German language island around Bielsko (German: Bielitz-Bialaer Sprachinsel).

Politically the village belonged initially to the Duchy of Cieszyn and Castellany of Oświęcim, which was in 1315 formed in the process of feudal fragmentation of Poland into the Duchy of Oświęcim, ruled by a local branch of Silesian Piast dynasty. In 1327 the duchy became a fee of the Kingdom of Bohemia. In 1457 Jan IV of Oświęcim agreed to sell the duchy to the Polish Crown, and in the accompanying document issued on 21 February the village was mentioned as Lipnik. The territory of the Duchy of Oświęcim was eventually incorporated into Poland in 1564 and formed Silesian County of Kraków Voivodeship.

In 1499 it became a seat of starostwo niegrodowe. A town of Biała began as a hamlet of Lipnik in the second half of the 16th century. In 1613 Biała was separated from Lipnik. Several other of its hamlets also grew to become independent, like Straconka, Międzybrodzie Lipnickie and Leszczyny.

Upon the First Partition of Poland in 1772 it became part of the Austrian Kingdom of Galicia. In 1789 starostwo of Lipnik was dissolved and the village grew more dependent on the town of Biała. In the 19th century it was industrialized. After World War I and fall of Austria-Hungary it became part of Poland. In 1925 it was absorbed by Biała, which was merged with Bielsko in 1951 to form Bielsko-Biała.

Born in Lipnik 
 Johannes Volkelt
 Artur Schnabel
 Karol Wojtyla, Sr., the father of Pope John Paul II

References 

Bielsko-Biała
Neighbourhoods in Silesian Voivodeship